KIJV (1340 AM) is a radio station licensed to serve Huron, South Dakota.  The station is owned by Performance Radio and licensed to Dakota Communications, Ltd and airs a Hot AC music format.

The station was assigned the KIJV call letters by the Federal Communications Commission.

Notable on-air personalities include Gary Outlaw, Ted "the Bear" Richards, Shawn Martin, JJ McKay, Dennis Harrington, Dave Sanders, and syndicated host Delilah Rene.

Ownership

In December 2003, Dakota Communications Ltd. (Duane Butt, president) reached an agreement to acquire this station and KZNC from Three Eagles Communications as part of a two-station deal for a reported $400,000. Dakota Communications has operated Huron's other two licensed radio stations, KOKK and KJRV-FM, since 1975.

August 2013 KIJV dropped its Oldies format in favor for Hot Adult Contemporary.  Dakota Communications had previously operated a Hot AC format in the Huron market before moving KXLG to the Watertown, South Dakota market.

History
KIJV began broadcasting June 30, 1947, as a Mutual affiliate (supplemented by transcriptions from NBC) on 1340 kHz with 250 W power. The first program featured civic officials and musicians from Huron College. The station was owned by the James Valley Broadcast Company.

References

External links
KIJV official website
Performance Radio website

IJV
Oldies radio stations in the United States
Huron, South Dakota
Beadle County, South Dakota
Mass media in the Mitchell, South Dakota micropolitan area
Radio stations established in 1947
1947 establishments in South Dakota